The First Auto is a 1927 film about the transition from horses to cars and the rift it causes in one family. It stars Charles Emmett Mack and Patsy Ruth Miller, with Barney Oldfield having a guest role in the movie. While mainly a silent film, it does have a Vitaphone sound-on-disc soundtrack with a synchronized musical score and sound effects, as well as some spoken words, cheering, and laughter.

Plot
In 1895, champion horse racer and livery stable owner Hank Armstrong is greatly disturbed by the advent of the "horseless carriage" in Maple City. He mocks Elmer Hays, a car manufacturer, when he states in a public lecture that the days of the horse are numbered and that a car will one day go 30 miles an hour. However, Armstrong's efforts are in vain. He quarrels with his friends when they start purchasing the machines and is only stopped from horsewhipping his own car-mad son Bob by the timely appearance of Bob's girlfriend Rose Robbins.

Bob leaves to find a job in nearby Detroit. There, he is present when famed driver Barney Oldfield (playing himself) breaks the speed record, driving a mile in a minute. Meanwhile, Hank goes bankrupt and has to sell off all his possessions to satisfy his creditors.

One day in 1905, Bob returns, without telling his father, to compete in the first car race in the county. A jealous rival for Rose's affections convinces Hank to tamper with a car on display so that it will explode. When Bob sends Rose to bring his father to the race, Hank is horrified to discover he has sabotaged his son's car. They hurry to the track, but are too late. Bob's car crashes and burns. Hank is convinced he has killed Bob and burns down his livery stable, but Rose brings word that Bob is expected to live. Relieved, Hank gives up his hopeless resistance and joins his son in his car manufacturing company.

Cast
Barney Oldfield as himself - the Master Driver
Patsy Ruth Miller as Rose Robbins
Charles Emmett Mack as Bob Armstrong
Russell Simpson as Hank Armstrong
Frank Campeau as Mayor Jim Robbins
William Demarest as Dave Doolittle, the village cut-up
Paul Kruger as Steve Bentley
Gibson Gowland as the blacksmith
E. H. Calvert as Elmer Hays, the inventor
Douglas Gerrard as Banker Stebbins, the richest man in town
Anders Randolf as the auctioneer (uncredited)

Production

To ensure authenticity and provide a measure of safety in the racing scenes for The First Auto, race car driver Barney Oldfield was hired as a technical coordinator.

Mack was killed in an accident while driving to work, prior to the end of filming. According to Robert Osborne of Turner Classic Movies, his car was struck broadside by a wagon on a country road. His co-star Patsy Ruth Miller had turned down a ride with him that day because she was not needed for filming until later. The last scene shows Hank at a car race, while Bob and Rose are away (off-screen) at a horse show.

Reception
The New York Times reviewer, Mordaunt Hall characterized The First Auto as "... packed with sentiment, but it is nevertheless a good entertainment." He noted that Oldfield was driving a famous race car, Henry Ford's 999.

See also
List of early Warner Bros. sound and talking features

References

External links
 
 

1927 films
1920s English-language films
American silent feature films
American black-and-white films
Films about automobiles
Films directed by Roy Del Ruth
Films produced by Darryl F. Zanuck
Films set in 1895
Films set in 1905
Transitional sound comedy-drama films
Warner Bros. films
1927 comedy-drama films
Early sound films
1920s American films
Silent American comedy-drama films